The Hervey Allen Study (also known as the Glade Estates) is a historic site in South Miami, Florida. It is located at 8251 Southwest 52nd Avenue. On May 7, 1974, it was added to the U.S. National Register of Historic Places. It was the home of novelist Hervey Allen.

References

External links

 Dade County listings at National Register of Historic Places
 Dade County listings at Florida's Office of Cultural and Historical Programs

Allen, Hervey
Houses on the National Register of Historic Places in Florida
Houses in Miami-Dade County, Florida